Imre Balázs Bacskai (born 29 January 1988) is a Hungarian professional boxer who has held the WBO Inter-Continental super-welterweight title since 2020. As an amateur, he competed at the 2016 Summer Olympics in the men's welterweight event, in which he was eliminated in the round of 32 by Souleymane Cissokho.

Professional career
He made his professional debut on 10 June 2017, defeating former amateur teammate Norbert Harcsa by unanimous decision to capture the vacant Hungarian middleweight title.

Professional boxing record

References

External links
 
 
 
 

1988 births
Living people
Hungarian male boxers
Olympic boxers of Hungary
Boxers at the 2016 Summer Olympics
Boxers at the 2015 European Games
European Games competitors for Hungary
Welterweight boxers
Middleweight boxers
Light-middleweight boxers
Boxers from Budapest
21st-century Hungarian people